"Fancy" (stylized in all caps) is a song by South Korean girl group Twice. It was released by JYP Entertainment on April 22, 2019, as the lead single from the group's seventh extended play, Fancy You.

Background and composition

"Fancy" was co-written by Black Eyed Pilseung, who has written many of Twice's previous title tracks including the debut single "Like Ooh-Ahh", "Cheer Up", "TT" and "Likey". The songwriting duo, which consists of Rado and Choi Kyu-sung, are credited alongside Jeon Goon. It was described as a "dramatic and dynamic song that features group in a totally new light". While keeping the group's previous quirky festive tone that has defined a majority of its hits, "Fancy" blends mellow mood pop electro beats with the members’ sophisticated, strong melodies. Singing about love, the bandmates boldly express their emotions with lines like "I won’t ever let you go" and "It doesn’t matter who liked who first".

Tamar Herman from Billboard described the song as a "bouncing electro-pop track that keeps the group’s quintessentially retro-inspired, addicting sound while turning to a bit of a bolder styling that revels in dynamic synths and playful digital quirks". The group's vocals take on a bit more of a mature, sultry tone during the verses, but maintains the group's exuberant, upbeat energy for the song's chorus.

Reception
"Fancy" debuted at number 3 both on Gaon's Digital Chart and K-pop Hot 100. It also peaked at number 4 both on Billboard World Digital Song Sales chart and Billboard Japan Hot 100, number 8 and 17 on Oricon Digital Singles and RMNZ Hot Singles, respectively. In April 2020, "Fancy" earned Silver streaming certification for surpassing 30 million streams on Oricon Streaming Singles Chart from the Recording Industry Association of Japan (RIAJ). The song ranked at number 5 on Dazed'''s 20 Best K-pop Songs of 2019. Billboard also included "Fancy" in their best K-pop songs  of the 2010s list.

Music video and promotion
The music video of "Fancy" was uploaded online on April 22, 2019. The visual introduces individual members in vibrant, stylish looks surrounded by vivid backdrops while the group itself switches off between bold black numbers and colorful "Fancy" outfits, much of which features Chanel's signature double "c" logo. The music video alternates between feelings of decadence and playfulness, largely thanks to the CGI graphics that bolster the nine member's performances. All the while, the group shows off powerful choreography. In the same day, the music video became the seventh-biggest debut on YouTube, garnering over 42.1 million views in a single day. The music video was ranked third place on 2019 YouTube's Most Popular Music Video in South Korea. It also ranked at No. 10 on 2019 YouTube's Top Trend Music Video in Japan.

Twice held a live broadcast on Naver V Live to commemorate their comeback, where they also performed the full choreography of the song for the first time. The group also promoted "Fancy" on several music programs in South Korea including M Countdown, Music Bank, Show! Music Core, Inkigayo and Show Champion'', on April 25, 26, 27, 28, and May 1, respectively.

Japanese version
The Japanese version of "Fancy" was released on July 24, 2019, as a B-side of Twice's 5th maxi single, "Breakthrough"'. The Japanese lyrics were written by Eri Osanai as well as Black Eyed Pilseung and Jeon Gun, who also wrote the original Korean lyrics.

Accolades

Award and nominations

Music program awards

Charts

Weekly charts

Monthly charts

Year-end charts

Certifications

See also 
 List of Inkigayo Chart winners (2019)
 List of most-viewed online videos in the first 24 hours
 List of M Countdown Chart winners (2019)

References

2019 singles
2019 songs
Korean-language songs
Twice (group) songs
JYP Entertainment singles